Georgios Mavromichalis (1800–1831) was a Greek who, along with his uncle Konstantinos Mavromichalis, assassinated the Governor of the First Hellenic Republic, Ioannis Kapodistrias, on 9 October 1831 outside of the Church of Saint Spyridion in Nafplio, Greece. He was the son of the Maniot insurgent Petrobey Mavromichalis, who had orchestrated the revolt against the Ottoman Empire's rulership over Greece.

When his father was captured, placed in prison and charged with high treason on the order of Ioannis Kapodistrias, Georgios and his uncle Konstantinos decided to exact revenge, as the apprehension of their patriarch was an act worthy of death according to their family. On , the duo decided to assassinate the Governor as he entered the Church of St. Spyridion in Nafplio. Konstantinos attempted to shoot Kapodistrias as he climbed the steps outside of the building, but the bullet missed and lodged in the church's wall where it remains visible to this day, and so he resorted to stabbing the governor in the stomach whilst Georgios impaled him through the heart, fatally wounding him. As the pair were escaping, the Greek army officer Gen. Fotomaras (who had witnessed the assassination from his own window across from the church before coming down to tend to the governor) shot Konstantinos  Georgios, however, managed to escape and hide in the French Embassy, but he surrendered to the Greek authorities after a few days. He was sentenced to death by a court-martial and was executed by firing squad. His final request that the executioners not shoot him in the head so as to not mirror the brutality of his uncle's death which had so shocked and traumatized him. His last words were, "peace brothers!"

Sources
Paroulakis, Peter H. The Greeks: Their Struggle For Independence. Hellenic International Press (1984). .

1800 births
1831 deaths
1831 murders in Europe
19th-century prime ministers of Greece
19th-century executions by Greece
Georgios
Greek assassins
Executed Greek people
People executed by Greece by firing squad
People executed for murder
People convicted of murder by Greece
Greek people convicted of murder
Assassins of heads of state
Maniots
Constantinopolitan Greeks